The 2019 Philippine Basketball Association (PBA) rookie draft was an event that allows teams to take turns selecting amateur basketball players and other eligible players, including half-Filipino foreign players. The league determined the drafting order based on the performance of two-thirds of the member teams from the 2019 season, with the worst team picking first.

Draft order
The draft order was determined based on the overall performance of the teams from the previous season. The Philippine Cup final ranking comprises 40% of the points, while the rankings of the Commissioner's and Governors' Cups are 25% each. The order for teams picking 9th to 12th was determined by their positions after the Governors' Cup regular round. NorthPort and Rain or Shine swapped places during the draft.

Special draft
There was a separate draft for the players in the pool for the Philippine national team, better known as Gilas Pilipinas. The five teams held their rights to the players they selected only after their release from international duty.

As part of the agreement between the PBA and the Samahang Basketbol ng Pilipinas, the latter named 5 players being loaned to Gilas's training camp after their selection in this special draft. The draft order was identical to the first five picks in the regular first and second rounds.

Draft selections

Special round

1st round

2nd round

3rd round

4th round

5th round

6th round
A sixth round was supposed to be held, but the teams from the fifth round passed, ending the draft.

Draft picks per school

Notes

Trades involving draft picks

Pre-draft trades
Prior to the day of the draft, the following trades were made and resulted in exchanges of picks between the teams.

References

External links
 PBA.ph

2019
PBA draft
2019–20 in Philippine basketball